UTC+04:00 is an identifier for a time offset from UTC of +04:00. In ISO 8601, the associated time would be written as 2019-02-07T23:28:34+04:00. This time is used in:

As standard time (year-round)
Principal cities: Abu Dhabi, Dubai, Baku, Tbilisi, Yerevan, Samara, Muscat, Port Louis, Victoria, Saint-Denis, Stepanakert

Europe

Eastern Europe
Russia – Samara Time
Southern Federal District
Astrakhan Oblast
Volga Federal District
Samara Oblast
Saratov Oblast
Udmurtia
Ulyanovsk Oblast

South Caucasus
Armenia – Armenia Time (used DST in 1981–2012)
Including Artsakh
Azerbaijan – Azerbaijan Time (used DST in 1981–2016)
Georgia – Georgia Time
Except Abkhazia and South Ossetia
Georgia moved from zone UTC+04:00 to UTC+03:00 on June 27, 2004, then back to UTC+04:00 on March 27, 2005.

Asia

Middle East
Oman – Time in Oman
United Arab Emirates – United Arab Emirates Standard Time

Africa
France
French Southern and Antarctic Lands
Crozet Islands
Scattered Islands in the Indian Ocean
Glorioso Islands and Tromelin Island
Réunion
Mauritius – Mauritius Time
Mauritius tried DST in 2008 but decided not to continue
Seychelles – Seychelles Time

Discrepancies between official UTC+04:00 and geographical UTC+04:00

Areas in UTC+04:00 longitudes using other time zones 
Using UTC+03:00
Yemen
 Socotra, the largest island in the Socotra Archipelago
The easternmost part of Al-Mahrah
Saudi Arabia
The easternmost part of Syarqiyah
Russia
 Most of Franz Josef Land, Yuzhny Island, and most of Severny Island (with an exception of the very east)
 Some parts of the Russian mainland (Komi Republic, Nenets Autonomous Okrug, east of Kirov Oblast and Tatarstan)

Using UTC+03:30

 Most parts of Iran

Using UTC+04:30

 Western parts of Afghanistan

Using UTC+05:00

Turkmenistan
Kazakhstan
 Aktobe
 Kyzylorda
 Parts of Mangystau, Atyrau, and West Kazakhstan
Uzbekistan
 Most parts of the country, including Samarkand
Pakistan
 Western parts, including Karachi
Russia
 Bashkortostan, Orenburg Oblast, Perm Krai, most parts of the Ural Federal District

Using UTC+06:00

Kazakhstan
 Kostanay
 A smaller parts of Turkistan
 Western parts of Karaganda, Akmola, and North Kazakhstan

Areas outside UTC+04:00 longitudes using UTC+04:00 time

Areas between 37°30' E and 52°30' E ("physical" UTC+03:00) 
Caucasus region:
 Georgia, excluding Abkhazia and South Ossetia
 Armenia and Artsakh 
 Azerbaijan
Russia, with parts of its territories:
 Astrakhan, Samara, Saratov and Ulyanovsk (with an exception of the very east)
 Western half of the of Udmurtia
United Arab Emirates
 The westernmost region of the Emirate of Abu Dhabi
Seychelles
 Aldabra Group
 Cosmoledo Atoll
Farquhar Group
French Southern and Antarctic Lands
 Crozet Islands

References

UTC offsets